Chorus Skating (1994) is a fantasy novel by American writer Alan Dean Foster. The book follows the continuing adventures of Jonathan Thomas Meriweather who is transported from our world into a land of talking animals and magic. It is the eighth book in the Spellsinger series.

Plot introduction
To avoid boredom, Spellsinger Jon-Tom and his faithful otter companion, Mudge, help in the search of a lost chord. Refurbishing some resourceless rogues, prying some pampered princesses from a brute bear, dealing with a sneaky salesman - all in day's work. Thrown out by a town, caught in a mocking maelstrom, a song of a siren leads to the attention of the cetacean community. Finally they have to face their nemesis: a very bad and thoroughly evil singer, a would-be great dictator. They do - with a little help from a Thranx.

External links

Alan Dean Foster homepage

1994 American novels
American fantasy novels
Novels by Alan Dean Foster
Spellsinger series